Concierge is an OSGI (Open Service Gateway Initiative) R3 framework implementation intended for resource-constrained devices like mobile and embedded systems.

Several new version exist and released in a eclipse project on  the Eclipse Concierge web site. This one implements RC5 OSGI Specification.

There have been no releases since 2009, so the project can be considered abandoned and obsolete.

See also
OSGi Alliance
Apache Felix
Equinox OSGi

Bibliography

External links 
Concierge Main page
The OSGi Alliance

Computer standards